The Federal Bailiffs Service or Federal Service of Court Bailiffs (FSSP, Russian: Федеральная служба судебных приставов [ФССП], Federalnaya Sluzhba Sudebnykh Pristavov, FSSP Rossii) is a federal law enforcement agency of the Ministry of Justice of Russia. 

The FSSP is the enforcement arm of the Judiciary of Russia, serving as the primary agency for protection of officers of the court, effective operation of the judiciary, fugitive operations, and providing security services and maintaining order within court facilities across Russia. The FSSP's head office is located at 16 Kuznetsky Most, Central Administrative Okrug, Moscow.

The FSSP was created during the presidency of Boris Yeltsin as the Department of Bailiffs in November 1997, and was elevated to a federal agency by Vladimir Putin in 2004. Sergey Sazanov has been the Acting Director of the FSSP and Chief Bailiff of the Russian Federation since February 2017.

Functions and Powers

Prisoner transport and processing
Judicial security
Bailiff services
Courthouse security
24-hour prisoner lockup jails and cell blocks
Protection of court buildings
Guard services to judges and other officers of the court

The Federal Bailiffs Service is the only authorized body of the Russian executive authority coercing the execution of the judicial decision. The FSSP ensures proper and timely execution of judicial acts, acts of other bodies and officials, as well as in cases stipulated by the legislation of the Russian Federation, execution of other documents in order to protect the abused rights, freedoms and legitimate interests of citizens and organizations.

Federal Bailiffs may search people as they enter the court and remove them if they refuse to be searched, they can also remove people in order to enable court business to be carried on without interference or delay, maintain order and secure the safety of any person in the court building. Officers may ask a person to surrender (and failing that seize) property if they believe it may jeopardise the maintenance of order in the court, put the safety of any person in the court building at risk, or may be evidence of, or in relation to, an offence. Federal Bailiffs are required to be biennially certified in the use of pepper spray, handcuffs, and defensive batons.

History
The Bailiffs’ Service formed in 1997, when federal laws No. 118 from 21 July 1997 "On Bailiffs" and Federal law 119 "On Enforcement Proceedings" were adopted. These laws fundamentally changed the system of enforcement proceedings in Russia and were legal basis for organizing an independent institution of bailiffs, and was known as The Department of Bailiffs of the Justice Ministry, and was acting under the order of the Russian Ministry of Justice from 22 September 2000 "On Approval of the Department of Bailiffs".

The Department became a Federal Service after it was formed by the Decree of the President of Russia Vladimir Putin, from 9 March 2004, Decree Number 314 "On the system and structure of the federal executive authorities".

Directors
The FSSP is headed by a director, a position which is accompanied with the title of Chief Bailiff of the Russian Federation. 

The current director is Sergey Sazanov, who has held the position since 15 February 2017. Sazanov was appointed as acting director following the appointment of Director Artur Parfenchikov as Head of the Republic of Karelia.

Ranks and rank insignia
On the basis of the Federal Law of 01.10.2019 N 328-FZ "On Service in the Compulsory Enforcement Bodies of the Russian Federation and Amendments to Certain Legislative Acts of the Russian Federation", class rates were replaced with special ranks.

See also

United States Marshals Service
Supreme Court Police
New York State Court Officers
Court security officer (England and Wales), UK equivalent

References

External links
 
  

Federal law enforcement agencies of Russia
1997 establishments in Russia
Court security